A Battle of Nerves (French: La Tête d'un homme, also known as A Man's Head) is a detective novel by Belgian writer Georges Simenon, featuring his character Inspector Jules Maigret. Published in 1931, it is one of the earliest of Simenon's "Maigret" novels, and one of eleven he had published that year.

It was one of the most successful of the early titles and among the first Maigrets to be filmed.

Plot summary
Maigret had been investigating the murder of Mme. Henderson, a rich American woman, and her maid, at her house in Saint-Cloud. Despite the evidence against the main suspect, Joseph Heurtin, which earned him the death sentence, Maigret feels sure Heurtin is not the guilty party. Convinced Heurtin knows the real killer, he contrives to let the man escape, following him to see where he leads. Heurtin heads for a small inn on the Seine, the Citanguette, where he lies low. Meanwhile Maigret pursues another lead, a note written from the Hotel Coupole. At the hotel, he finds William Kirby, Mme. Henderson's nephew, and an impoverished medical student, Johann Radek. While Maigret is there, Heurtin arrives, at which Radek contrives to have himself arrested on a minor charge. While in custody, Radek taunts Maigret over his lack of success in the case, hinting that he knows the full story and who the real killer is.

Maigret has to endure Radek's needling while pursuing his investigation until he is able to turn the tables on him and unmask the real killer.

Other titles
The book has been translated twice into English; in 1939 by Geoffrey Sainsbury as A Battle of Nerves (and variously reprinted as A Man's Head, The Patience of Maigret and Maigret's War of Nerves) and in 2015 by David Coward as A Man's Head.

Adaptations
A Man's Head has been dramatized numerous times, in several languages. First filmed in 1933, just two years after publication, and was among the first to be filmed.

The story has been filmed twice: In French, in 1933, as A Man's Neck;  starring Harry Baur in the title role, and in English, in 1950, as The Man on the Eiffel Tower (with Charles Laughton).

It has also been adapted for television seven times: in 1963, the title was changed to Death in Mind and it was filmed for the BBC series starring Rupert Davies; in Italian in 1965 (Gino Cervi) for Le inchieste del commissario Maigret; in Dutch in 1969 (Jan Teulings); and in Russian in 1992 (Vladimir Samoilov). It has been adapted  for French TV on three occasions: in 1967, for the Jean Richard series, and re-made for that series in 1983; and in 1996 for the French television series starring Bruno Cremer.

Notes

References
 Georges Simenon A Man's Head (1931; translated G Sainsbury, reprinted 2006) Penguin Red Classics, London

External links
 Maigret at trussel.com
 A Man's Head by Patrick Marnham (2003) at trussel.com.

1931 Belgian novels
Maigret novels
Belgian novels adapted into films